Events from the year 1527 in Ireland.

Incumbent 
Lord: Henry VIII

Events 

 Edmond de Burca is succeeded as Mac William Iochtar by Seaán an Tearmainn Bourke.
 Edmund Butler, archbishop of Cashel, is consecrated.
 James Butler, 9th earl of Ormond, becomes Esquire of the Body to King Henry VIII.
 John Rawson, 1st and only Viscount Clontarf, is appointed commander of the light infantry of Order of St. John of Jerusalem.
 Rychard Martin is succeeded as Mayor of Galway by William Morris.

Births 
 March 21 – Edward Fitton, the elder, Lord President of Connaught and Thomond and the Vice-Treasurer of Ireland (died 1579).
 May 21 – Philip II of Spain, King of England and Ireland (died 1598).
 October 2 – William Drury, Lord President of Munster and Lord Justice of Ireland, is born in Hawstead, Suffolk (died 1579).
 Elizabeth FitzGerald, Countess of Lincoln, Irish noblewoman (died 1590).
 John Garvey, Protestant Bishop of Kilmore and Archbishop of Armagh (died 1595).
 John Hooker, Member of parliament for Athenry (died 1601).
 William Good, English Jesuit teacher in Limerick (died 1586).

Deaths

 September 30 – Donnchadh mac Eoghan Ó Duinnshléibhe, Irish physician.
 John Rycardes, Master of the Rolls in Ireland and Dean of St Patrick's Cathedral.

References 

 
1520s in Ireland
Ireland
Years of the 16th century in Ireland